Fany Santa Chalas Frías (born 2 February 1993 in El Seibo) is a Dominican sprinter.

She won gold medals over 100 and 200 metres at the 2012 Central American and Caribbean Junior Championships in Athletics in San Salvador.

Personal bests

International competitions

1: Irregular mark: Wind gauge malfunction.
2: Disqualified in the B Final.
3: Disqualified in the final.

References

External links

1993 births
Living people
Place of birth missing (living people)
Afro-Dominican (Dominican Republic)
Dominican Republic female sprinters
World Athletics Championships athletes for the Dominican Republic
Athletes (track and field) at the 2010 Summer Youth Olympics